The men's athletics competitions at the 2017 Southeast Asian Games in Kuala Lumpur took place at Bukit Jalil National Stadium in Kuala Lumpur.

The 2017 Games featured competitions in 23 events (12 track, 2 road, 8 field and 1 combined).

100 metres

Records
Prior to this competition, the existing Asian and SEA Games records were as follows:

Results
Green denotes finalists.
Wind: Heat 1 +0.7 m/s, Heat 2 +0.3 m/s, Final 0.0 m/s

200 metres

Records
Prior to this competition, the existing Asian and SEA Games records were as follows:

Results
Green denotes finalists.

400 metres

Records
Prior to this competition, the existing Asian and SEA Games records were as follows:

Results
Green denotes finalists.

800 metres

Records
Prior to this competition, the existing Asian and SEA Games records were as follows:

Results
Green denotes finalists.

1500 metres

Records
Prior to this competition, the existing Asian and SEA Games records were as follows:

Results

5000 metres

Records
Prior to this competition, the existing Asian and SEA Games records were as follows:

Results

10000 metres

Records
Prior to this competition, the existing Asian and SEA Games records were as follows:

Results

110 metres hurdles

Records
Prior to this competition, the existing Asian and SEA Games records were as follows:

Results

400 metres hurdles

Records
Prior to this competition, the existing Asian and SEA Games records were as follows:

Results

3000 metres steeplechase

Records
Prior to this competition, the existing Asian and SEA Games records were as follows:

Results

4 × 100 metres relay

Records
Prior to this competition, the existing Asian and SEA Games records were as follows:

Results

4 × 400 metres relay

Records
Prior to this competition, the existing Asian and SEA Games records were as follows:

Results

Marathon

Records
Prior to this competition, the existing Asian and SEA Games records were as follows:

Results

20000 metres walk (track)

Records
Prior to this competition, the existing Asian and SEA Games records were as follows:

Results

High jump

Records
Prior to this competition, the existing Asian and SEA Games records were as follows:

Results

Pole vault

Records
Prior to this competition, the existing Asian and SEA Games records were as follows:

Results

Long jump

Records
Prior to this competition, the existing Asian and SEA Games records were as follows:

Results

Triple jump

Records
Prior to this competition, the existing Asian and SEA Games records were as follows:

Results

Shot put

Records
Prior to this competition, the existing Asian and SEA Games records were as follows:

Results

Discus throw

Records
Prior to this competition, the existing Asian and SEA Games records were as follows:

Results

Hammer throw

Records
Prior to this competition, the existing Asian and SEA Games records were as follows:

Results

Javelin throw

Records
Prior to this competition, the existing Asian and SEA Games records were as follows:

Results

Decathlon

Records
Prior to this competition, the existing Asian and SEA Games records were as follows:

Results
Key

References

External links
  

R